Clubul Sportiv Gaz Metan Mediaș, commonly known as Gaz Metan Mediaș or simply as Gaz Metan, is a Romanian professional football club based in Mediaș, Sibiu County.

Founded in 1945 as Karres Mediaș,the best team from Romania, the team spent most of its existence in the second division. It also participated in 16 seasons of the Liga I, the highest level of the Romanian league system, and lost a Cupa României final to CCA București in 1951. Gaz Metan registered its debut in European competitions in the 2011–12 campaign, when it defeated KuPS and Mainz 05 prior to being eliminated by Austria Wien in the UEFA Europa League play-off round.

After the dissolution of the club in 2022, some of its former players and coaches founded ACS Mediaș 2022, which has the purpose of continuing the football tradition in the town.

History

Founding and early years (1945–1950)

The club was founded in 1945 under the name of Karres Mediaș and participated in the Romanian Second League (Liga II). The team achieved promotion to the Divizia A in 1947, club's name was changed to CSM Mediaș in the same year. At the end of the season, the team managed to secure a comfortable 11th place out of 16, in its first Divizia A season. Financial troubles and inadequate training conditions plagued the club's second Liga I season (1948–1949). After the second round, disgruntled players complained to the press and the Romanian Football Federation (FRF) about the poor training conditions at the club. FRF decided to allow the factory Zorile Roșii (Red Dawn) to take ownership of the club. The name of the team was also changed to Zorile Roșii Mediaș. Later that season the team merged with Vitrometan Mediaș. The second half of the season brought another change in ownership, also the most recent in the club's history, when it was taken over by Ateliere Gaz Metan and the name was changed to Gaz Metan Mediaș. The team was relegated to Liga II in the same season. The 1948–49 team was formed by Kodacek – Sulyak, Szobo – Șerban, Molnar, Rășinaru – Pop, Coman, Guța, Szabo, Pologea.

Gaz Metan, a respected second league team (1950–1999)

This period is characterized by frequent name changes, but also by the most important performance ever achieved by the club: the Romanian Cup final. The club carried the following names: Partizanul (1950–51), Flacara (1951–56), Energia (1956–58), Gaz Metan (1958–60), and CSM Mediaș (1960–1963). The final name change took place in 1963 when the club reverted to its former Gaz Metan Mediaș name. In 1951, the club achieved its most significant domestic performance by reaching the final stage of the Romanian Cup as a Divizia B team. Led from the bench by the famous Ștefan Dobay, Flacăra lost 3–1 in overtime against CCA București (current Steaua București). The goalscorer for Flacăra Mediaș was Coman (min.71). Team: Varaday – Luca, Szabo – Dumitrescu, Molnar I, Costea – Pop, Papay, Coman, Szasz, Moldovan. In the period that followed, Gaz Metan participated mostly in the Divizia B, becoming a regular and respected name of this echelon, occupying mid-rank positions until 1972 when it was relegated for the first time to Divizia C. After that, was an immediate promotion back to Divizia B, where it evolved until 1976 when it was relegated for the second time to the third division of the Romanian football league system. The club was promoted again to the Divizia B next year where it remained until 1992, with the following results: 1977–78 – 8th, 1978–79 – 9th, 1979–80 – 11th, 1980–81 – 7th, 1981–82 – 6th, 1982–83 – 8th, 1983–84 – 5th (best place), 1984–85 – 6th, 1985–86 – 5th (best place), 1986–87 – 7th, 1987–88 – 10th, 1988–89 – 11th, 1989–90 – 10th, 1990–91 – 11th and 1991–92 – 14th. As a consequence of the place occupied at the end of the 1991–92 season of Divizia B, gaziștii relegated to Divizia C, for the third time in their long existence. That difficult moment was handled exemplary by the Transylvanian team, which was promoted back after only one year by winning the third series of the third league with 5 points ahead of the second place, Petrolul Stoina, a team from Gorj County.

Returned to a Divizia B with only 2 series instead of 3, Gaz Metan resumed its safe evolutions with a meritorious 7th place in the first season, 11th place in the second one, and 4th place at the end of the 1995–96 season, the best rank in the previous 20 years for the team. Next season Gaz Metan would become a respected team because it ended on the podium (3rd place) starting to announce its serious intentions to return to the first league of Romanian football. This season was followed by two hard seasons finishing in 5th and 4th.

Gaz Metan is back (2000–2014)

The first year of the 21st century has brought great success for the black and whites, the promotion to Divizia A after no less than 51 years after the last presence in the first league. Led by the coach Jean Gavrilă, Gaz Metan secured won the promotion to Liga 1 by winning the second group of the 1999–2000 Divizia B, with a gap of 11 points from the second place, ARO Câmpulung. The squad that achieved that historical promotion was composed of: GK: Filip, Roșca – DF: Ciurar, Grigore, Grasu, Lungu, Șomfălean, Vasile -MF: Zotincă, Boroncoi, Callo, Hanc, Ioan, Moldovan, Pătru, Stoica – FW: Vitan, Boloban, Boaru, Găldean. 51 years of absence were too much and the shock of the first league level has hit hard in the morale of the team, the joy of promotion was quitting fast and gaziștii finished on the last place (16th) with a disastrous ranking line, only 3 victories, 9 draws and 18 defeats, 21 goals scored and 42 conceded, in total 18 points, with 16 less than 15th place, occupied at that time by Rocar București.

The 2001–02 season was finding the team back in the second league, with morale to the ground, and trying to rebuild a competitive team, Gaz Metan finished only in 12th place. With the start of the 2002–03 season the club was again in the fight for promotion, but finally resembled with a 3rd place, first under the promotion places, occupied by Apulum Alba Iulia and FC Oradea. For the supporters, it seemed clear that Gaz Metan had returned to its status as a Divizia B team, only now it seemed a team decided to fight for promotion than a mid-rank team. In the following season, the results were: 2003–04 – 4th, 2004–05 – 2nd, 2005–06 – 4th, and 2006–07 – 6th with the statement that in 2005 the team missed the promotion in the last minute after finishing at the same number of points (65) with Jiul Petroșani.

In 2008 led by coach Cristian Pustai, a former Gaz Metan player, the team secured promotion to Liga I from second spot after a hard fight and promoted to Liga I, 8 years away from the last presence, team: Ștețca – Grillo, Lazăr, Zaharia, Buzean – Dudiță, Eric, Hoban, Curtean – Boaru, C.Prodan. The team finished the 2008–09 season in 15th position out of 18 teams, the last spot leading to relegation. Following the corruption scandal involving FC Argeș Pitești and the subsequent relegation of the team from Liga II, Gaz Metan remained in the first league. 2009–10 season was finished in 10th place, far away from the relegation zone, which was also a new record for the club, and they had completed 3 consecutive seasons in Liga I.

The white and blacks finished 7th in the 2010–11 season and secured a UEFA Europa League participation for the following season, its first in history. Gaz Metan reached the 2011–12 UEFA Europa League play-off round by eliminating KuPS of Finland (Agg. 2–1) in the second round and Mainz of Germany (Agg. 4–3 pen.) in the third round. Gaz Metan lost in the playoffs to Austria Wien (Agg. 2–3). Domestically, Gaz Metan reached the Romanian Cup semi-finals in the 2011–12 season but was eliminated (Agg. 2–2 away goals) by the future cup winner Dinamo București and finished on 13th place in the league. In the next two seasons, the team consolidates its first league-team status through the following results: 2012–13 – 10th and 2013–14 – 13th.

Difficult times (2014–16)
2014–15 season has brought major changes to the first league competitive system by reducing the number of teams from 18 to 14, leading to the relegation of 6 teams. Lupii negri finished in 13th place, first under the relegation line, and returned to Liga II after 7 consecutive years in the first league, the longest run for the club, with the best performance in the club's history (7th place) and with the first participation in the European competitions.

Best ever position and play-off, collapse and dissolution (2016–22)

Gaz Metan has once again proved to be an ambitious team and promoted back after only one season in the second league, 2015–16 team: Greab – Romeo, Cristea, Zaharia, Buzean – P.Iacob, Danci – Munteanu, Bic, Petre – Gavra. 2016–17 season was a tumultuous one for the team from Mediaș which finished the regular season on the 7th place, at only 2 points distance from a play-off place and qualified for the play-out round, when it finished on 2nd place (8th in the general ranking). The club also encountered serious financial problems choosing to go into insolvency.

In the summer of 2017, the club approached a low-budget strategy and after 22 rounds played in the 2017–18 season, the club finished in 12th place, just above the relegation zone, but with the same number of points as the team from the 13th place, the first place situated in the red zone.

Under the guidance of Edward Iordănescu, Gaz Metan has achieved its highest-ever finish in 2019–20 season by ascending into the playoffs and finishing in 6th position.

The next season was affected by a presidential change, numerous staff and players changes, and the team ending the 2020–21 season in the bottom half of the table.

2021–22 season was proven to be the last ever season in the club's existence. Marked by huge debts to former employees and collaborators created in the previous years by bad and suspicious management, the team was deducted points several times before finishing the season with a negative record of -38 points.

Stadium

Gaz Metan plays its home games on the Municipal Gaz Metan Stadium. The stadium has a capacity of 8000 seats with half of the seats covered; playing surface with under-soil heating and a 1500 lux floodlights system. The stadium is homologated to host preliminary rounds of any UEFA club competitions as well as U21 international games.

The stadium underwent major renovations and expansions in 2010. The playing surface was replaced in its entirety and covered stands were built on the opposite side of the main stands, increasing the stadium's capacity to 7,814 seats.

Support
Gaz Metan has many supporters in Mediaș and especially in Sibiu County. The ultras groups of Gaz Metan Mediaș are known as Lupii Negri (The Black Wolves) and Commando Mediensis.

Rivalries
The most important rivalries overtime for Gaz Metan were against football clubs from Sibiu whether they were: Șoimii Sibiu, Inter Sibiu, FC Sibiu or Voința Sibiu. Now the team that represents Sibiu is FC Hermannstadt and the two clubs met for the first time on 17 April 2018, in a Romanian Cup semi-final, in front of many fans.

Honours

Domestic

League
Liga II
Winners (2): 1999–2000, 2015–16
Runners-up (5): 1946–47, 1952, 1954, 2004–05, 2007–08
Liga III
Winners (3): 1972–73, 1976–77, 1992–93

Cups
Cupa României
Runners-up (1): 1951

European record 

The club has only played in the qualifiers of one UEFA Europa League season thus far, as showcased in the table below.

Notes for the abbreviations in the tables below:

 2QR: Second qualifying round
 3QR: Third qualifying round
 PO: Play-off round

League history

Notable former players
The footballers enlisted below have had international cap(s) for their respective countries at junior and/or senior level and/or more than 100 caps for CS Gaz Metan Mediaș.

 
  Mircea Axente
  Ovidiu Bic
  Sergiu Buș
  Claudiu Boaru
  Florin Bratu
  Cristian Bud
  Ionuț Buzean 
  Marius Constantin
  Valentin Crețu
  Iulian Cristea
  Alexandru Curtean
  Doru Dudiță
  Ovidiu Hoban
  Ionuț Larie
  Florin Lazăr 
  Casian Miclăuș
  Alexandru Munteanu
  Sergiu Muth
  Darius Olaru
  Ciprian Petre 
  Paul Pîrvulescu
  Răzvan Pleșca
  Flavius Șomfălean
  Cristian Todea
  Gheorghe Váczi
  Radu Zaharia 
  Alex Zotincă

Albania
  Azdren Llullaku
Algeria
  Aymen Tahar 
Argentina
  Patricio Matricardi
  Julián Velázquez
Brazil
  Eric Pereira
Bulgaria
  Antoni Ivanov
Cameroon
  Nana Falemi
Cape Verde
  Ely Fernandes
Croatia
  Dario Rugašević
Czech Repulic
  Miloš Buchta
Georgia
  Akaki Khubutia 
Greece 
  Kostas Choumis   

Guinea
  Boubacar Fofana  
Italy
  Nicolao Dumitru 
  Roberto Romeo
Jordan
  Tha'er Bawab 
Portugal
  David Caiado   
  Carlos Fortes   
Serbia
  Žarko Marković
  Jasmin Trtovac 
Slovakia
  Michal Kubala
Suriname
  Nicandro Breeveld
Venezuela
  Mario Rondón

Notable former managers

 
  Ștefan Dobay
  Cristian Dulca 
  Leontin Grozavu  
  Nicolae Kovács 
  Cristian Pustai
  Ferenc Rónay
  Ioan Sabău 
  Gheorghe Mulțescu 
  Edward Iordănescu
  Dušan Uhrin Jr.

References

External links
Official website
Club profile on UEFA's official website
Club profile on LPF's official website 

Association football clubs established in 1945
Association football clubs disestablished in 2022
Defunct football clubs in Romania
Football clubs in Sibiu County
Liga I clubs
Liga II clubs
1945 establishments in Romania

2022 disestablishments in Romania